Rec Room is a virtual reality massively multiplayer online game with an integrated game creation system developed and published by Against Gravity. Rec Room is currently available on Microsoft Windows, Xbox One, Xbox Series X and Series S, PlayStation 4, PlayStation 5, Meta Quest 2, Meta Quest Pro, Pico Neo 3, Pico 4, the App Store (iOS/iPadOS), and Android.

Gameplay 
A hub room (called the “Rec Center”) is a recreational center (thus earning the game's title of Rec Room) with doors that lead to various games called Rec Room Originals and featured user-generated rooms. 

The game can optionally be played on a virtual reality headset, specifically using SteamVR, virtual reality headsets by Reality Labs, and PlayStation VR. In virtual reality mode, the game uses full 3D motion via the motion capture system of a virtual reality headset and two hand-held motion controllers, which are required to pick up and handle objects in the game world, including balls, weapons, construction tools, and other objects. Players can explore the space around them within the confines of their physical floor-space while roaming further by using the controller buttons to teleport a short distance, with minimal to no virtual reality sickness. A “walking” mode enables players to move continuously rather than teleporting; however, this poses a higher risk of motion sickness.

When creating rooms, users can use the "Maker Pen"; a tool resembling a doodle gun, that can be used to draw shapes in 3D. This is mainly used to create user-generated rooms. Players can also code in Circuits, which is Rec Room'''s programming language, which is very similar to languages like BASIC and Lua

In Rec Room, users can pay for a monthly subscription called Rec Room Plus. This monthly subscription grants the subscribers to this subscription several features; including the ability to sell their own user-generated content. Users can sell this content for in-game currency. This currency can be transferred to money in the real world. This lets in-game creators get paid with real-world money.

 Game modes Rec Room consists of separate built-in multiplayer games, which are known as Rec Room Originals. The games include first-person shooters, a Battle Royale game, cooperative action-adventure games, a Pictionary-like game, and various sports games. Rec Room also provides in-game tools for user-generated content, which led to the creation of many user-generated experiences.

 Music 
Most of the music found in the game's Rec Room Originals is made by Cameron Brown, who goes by the username "Gribbly"

 Development 
Seattle-based development studio Rec Room Inc. (formerly Against Gravity Corp) was co-founded in April 2016 by Nick Fajt, Cameron Brown, Dan Kroymann, Bilal Orhan, Josh Wehrly, and John Bevis.  Prior to that, CEO Nicholas Fajt worked as a program manager on the HoloLens team at Microsoft. Dan Kroymann worked on the same team after working on the Xbox team. Rec Room Inc.′s CCO Cameron Brown also worked at Microsoft as HoloLens Creative Director.

In 2016 and early 2017, the company raised $5 million in funding for the development of Rec Room and its player community. According to CEO Nick Fajt, the company will keep Rec Room free to download. 

In 2017, Rec Room “Junior Mode” was COPPA-certified by Samet Privacy.

In June 2019, Rec Room Inc. announced that the company raised an additional $24 million over two rounds of funding. In December 2020, Rec Room Inc. announced additional $20 million in funding.

In March 2021, Rec Room Inc. announced another funding round of $100 million with a valuation of $1.25 billion leading to its unicorn status.

In December 2021, Rec Room Inc. announced that they raised $145 million during another funding round, bringing the studio's valuation up to $3.5 billion.

 Reception 
Dan Ackerman, writing for CNET, described Rec Room as VR's killer app.

In January 2017, Ars Technica reported that trolling and harassment in Rec Room was a problem.

In June 2017 MIT Technology Review contributor Rachel Metz described it as a great example of VR's potential for social interaction while criticizing its underdeveloped anti-abuse features.

Filmmaker Joyce Wong described Rec Room'' as her choice of “most interesting piece of art in 2017”.

References

External links 

 Official website
 Official community website

2016 video games
Android (operating system) games
Cooperative video games
First-person video games
Free-to-play video games
HTC Vive games
IOS games
Massively multiplayer online games
Meta Quest games
Multiplayer and single-player video games
Oculus Rift games
PlayStation 4 games
PlayStation 5 games
PlayStation VR games
Social casual games
Video game development software
Video games developed in the United States
Video games with cel-shaded animation
Video games with cross-platform play
Video games with user-generated gameplay content
Virtual reality communities
Virtual reality games
Windows games
Xbox One games
Xbox Series X and Series S games